Alex Shabunya (born 4 October 1977 in Navapolatsk, Belarus) is a Belarusian professional bodybuilder.

Before taking up bodybuilding Alex Shabunya was doing skiing, boxing and wrestling.

In 1995, Alex Shabunya started gym training. His first trainer was Sergei Muchenko.

In 1997, Alex Shabunya took part in a number of WABBA tournaments. In 1998, Shabunya made his IFBB debut. Shabunya is a seven-time Mr Belarus.

In 2005 Shabunya became a member of the IronWorld Club. He moved to the capital Minsk and began to train on his own. He won the 2005 Eastern Europe title, the 2005 Iron Man Grand Prix and the 2005 Iron World tournament.

Personal life
Alex Shabunya lives in Minsk, Belarus. He is a firefighter at the 
Belarusian Ministry of Emergency Situations.

Competitive stats
 Height:  6 ft 1"(185 cm)
 Off-season weight: 287 lbs(130 kg)
 Competition weight: 271 lbs(123 kg)
 Arms: 22"(56 cm)
 Chest: 55"(140 cm)
 Thigh: 32"(81 cm)

Competitive history
2000 IFBB European Amateur Championships, Heavyweight, 15th
2001 IFBB European Amateur Championships, Heavyweight, 13th
2003 IFBB European Amateur Championships, Super Heavyweight, 3rd

See also
 IFBB Professional League

External links
Alex Shabunya website
Images of Alex Shabunya

1977 births
Living people
People from Navapolatsk
Belarusian bodybuilders
Belarusian sportsmen
Sportspeople from Vitebsk Region